Diplocidaridae is an extinct family of sea urchins.

These slow-moving low-level epifaunal grazer-omnivores lived in the Jurassic period, from 161.2 to 150.8 Ma.

Generas
Diplocidaris Desor, 1855
Rolliericidaris
Tetracidaris

References

 
Oxfordian first appearances
Jurassic extinctions